Raphaël Eyongo (born 21 May 2003) is a Dutch professional footballer who plays as a forward for Excelsior.

Professional career
Eyongo is a youth product of Feyenoord and NAC Breda, before moving to the youth academy of Excelsior at the age of 13. He made his professional debut with Excelsior as a late substitute in a 4–2 KNVB Cup loss to Groningen on 15 December 2021. On 13 November 2022, he signed his first professional contract with the club for a 1+1year option.

Personal life
Born in the Netherlands, Eyongo is of Congolese (DR) descent.

References

External links
 
 

2003 births
Living people
Footballers from Breda
Dutch footballers
Dutch people of Democratic Republic of the Congo descent
Excelsior Rotterdam players
Eredivisie players
Eerste Divisie players
Association football forwards